Labour Faction or Labor Faction can refer to:

Labour Faction (1937)
Labour Faction (1989)
Erroneous reference to any Labour Party (disambiguation)

See also
 Labour action, a work stoppage, usually in response to employee grievances